Guglielmo Stendardo (born 6 May 1981) is an Italian football coach and former player, who played as a central defender.

He is currently in charge as head coach of Eccellenza amateurs LUISS.

Club career

Early career
Stendardo began his career at Napoli in 1997 and has played for a number of top Italian football clubs, including Sampdoria, Lazio, and Juventus, as well as early spells with Salernitana and Perugia; during his time with the latter club, he was sent on loan to Catania for the 2003–04 season.

Journeyman: Lazio, Juventus return and Lecce
Stendardo was signed by S.S. Lazio in August 2005 on a free transfer. His previous club A.C. Perugia, went bankrupted at the start of 2005–06 season. After a 3–2 defeat to Juventus in late 2007, Stendardo had a falling-out with Lazio manager Delio Rossi and demanded a transfer during the January 2008 transfer window.

In January 2008, Juventus officially announced the signing of Stendardo to a 6-month loan deal, for €400,000, with an option to buy him outright in the summer. On 1 September he was loaned to Lecce in a one-year deal, and spent the 2008–09 season with the Giallorossi with little success, as the side went relegated to Serie B.

Stendardo then returned to Lazio at the end of the season, and played 33 Serie A games for the club during the next 2 seasons.

Atalanta
After making no appearances in 2011–12, he left for Atalanta in January 2012, on loan until June. In August, he was bought outright by La Dea.

Coaching career
In August 2021, Stendardo took over on his first role as a first team manager, coaching Eccellenza amateurs LUISS, the football branch of the Libera Università Internazionale degli Studi Sociali Guido Carli.

Style of play
Despite his lack of pace or notable technical skills, Stendardo has made a name for himself as a large, tall, physically strong and tenacious central defender.

Personal life
Stendardo's brother, Mariano, is also a footballer. During his playing career, Guglielmo managed to obtain a law degree; in December 2012, he was the source of controversy when he pulled out of a Coppa Italia match against Roma in order to sit an exam in Salerno for his law degree, and was subsequently fined by Atalanta.

References

External links
Gazzetta profile  

FIGC International stats  
Guglielmo Stendardo at Topforward

1981 births
Living people
Footballers from Naples
Italian footballers
Serie A players
Serie B players
S.S.C. Napoli players
U.C. Sampdoria players
U.S. Salernitana 1919 players
Catania S.S.D. players
A.C. Perugia Calcio players
S.S. Lazio players
Juventus F.C. players
U.S. Lecce players
Atalanta B.C. players
Delfino Pescara 1936 players
Association football central defenders